Fairview is a suburb of Mossel Bay, a large town on the south coast of the Western Cape province in South Africa

References

Populated places in the Mossel Bay Local Municipality